Melanie Cheng is an Australian doctor and author of two books, Australia Day (2017) and Room for a Stranger (2019). Cheng draws upon her biracial, Chinese-Australian heritage as well as her experience as a medical professional to inform her fictional work.

Australia Day is Cheng's debut fictional work. It is a collection of fourteen short stories exploring the multicultural nature of the Australian experience. It was the recipient of the 2018 Victorian Premier's Literary Award for Fiction. Her second book, Room for a Stranger, was published in 2019 and has received critical acclaim, including being longlisted for the 2020 Miles Franklin Literary Award. She was shortlisted for the 2018 Horne Prize for her essay, "All the Other Stories".

Cheng has also published numerous articles on her experiences in general practice to journalism outlets such as the ABC and SBS. She continues to write and practice medicine. She currently resides with her husband and two children in Melbourne, Australia.



Early life and education 
Cheng was born in Adelaide, Australia and moved to Hong Kong in 1986 wherein she attended an English-speaking school. She is of Chinese-Australian heritage and her biracial, Eurasian background has had a significant influence on her experience growing up as well as her writing practice.

She studied medicine at a Melbourne university and graduated in 2003. Thereafter, she interned and worked in hospitals, and volunteered with an Australian-based NGO in Cambodia, before making the decision to pursue general practice. While she wrote casually for personal leisure throughout her years of schooling, Cheng pursued the craft more seriously after attending a gathering of the Creative Doctors Network organisation in Sydney. There, she "met doctors who were also writers, actors, directors, photographers and musicians" who "encouraged and validated" her work. The practice of writing became "a compulsion, something [she] needed to do", which incited her to consult Writers Victoria, wherein she attended a short story course with tutor Emmett Stinson and expanded her network, including meeting her mentor Mark Smith.

Awards 
Before the publication of her two novels, Cheng  was the runner up in the Deborah Cass Writing Prize in 2016 and won the Unpublished Manuscript award in the Victorian Premier's Literary Awards in the same year.

Australia Day, won the 2018 Victorian Premier's Literary Award for Fiction, and Room for a Stranger, which was longlisted for the 2020 Miles Franklin Award.

Publications

Australia Day (2017) 
Australia Day is a collection of fourteen short stories that was published in May 2017. The collection's title comes from the official Australian national public holiday, which occurs annually on 26 January and marks the anniversary of the 1788 arrival of the First Fleet of British ships at Port Jackson, New South Wales, and the raising of the Flag of Great Britain at Sydney Cove by Governor Arthur Phillip. Australia Day celebrations reflect the diverse society and landscape of the nation. In line with the Australian government's commitment to celebrating the nation's multicultural makeup, Cheng's collection comprises stories that explore the experiences of predominantly non-white Australians.

The stories are written in the realist tradition and are all focused on the experiences of its racially and culturally diverse characters. Particularly, the stories examine the characters' "flaws, failings and vulnerability ... as well as their grit and strength as they struggle with everyday challenges ... like trying to fit in, make friends, find love or cope with loss." The collection is preceded with an epigraph and subsequently book-ended by two stories that are set on Australia Day.

The epigraph is a statement made by the former Australian Prime Minister Malcolm Turnbull, wherein he stated that “there has never been a more exciting time to be an Australian.” It was the first public statement Turnbull made after assuming the incumbent Liberal National Party's leadership from Tony Abbott on September 14, 2015.

 “Australia Day” focalises the experience of Stanley Chu, an international student from Hong Kong, who travels with his fellow medical student, Jessica Cook, to meet her family for an Australia Day celebration in inner Melbourne. There, Stanley experiences tense and awkward interactions with Jessica's family and ex-boyfriend, who all embody the white Australian archetype: Anglo-Saxon and charming with a proclivity for banter. As such, the story explores the "gulf that is cultural, personal and sexual" between Stanley and the other, white and Australian characters in the story, and this gulf "acts as a synecdoche for identity on a national scale".
 “Big Problems” explores the experience of Leila Ayers, a white-passing Englishwoman of Syrian background, who has been granted a short break from her au pair duties to travel to Alice Springs. In the tour group, she is joined by an Australian couple with their young children and a South African woman named Ellen, amongst others. Each of her tour group companions have various attitudes towards the ethical question of whether or not to climb Uluru.
 “Macca” is set in a regional Australian town and follows Dr Emily Garrett as she struggles to remain emotionally and professionally detached from Macca, a poor and homeless male patient directed by court order to see a general practitioner for his alcoholism.
 “Clear Blue Skies” follow the newlyweds Kat and Raf as they honeymoon in the Maldives. Raf is now a rich professional in the finance industry – a huge contrast to his past as a struggling Iraqi refugee. In comparison, Kat is a freelance writer. Their difference in income becomes a source of Kat's insecurity, and creates tension for the couple as they grapple with contrasting attitudes to spending on luxury experiences.
 “Ticket-holder Number 5” follows Tania, a clerk at a Roads & Maritime Services office, who carries a can of capsicum spray in her bag in case of violent encounters with customers. Her usual impregnable facade begins to crack as one day at work, Tania encounters Alice Pickering, a sobbing woman who asks to transfer the registration for a vehicle under her now-dead husband's name.
 “Hotel Cambodia” concerns Melissa, a woman of Anglo-Singaporean background, who volunteers as a nurse at an NGO-run clinic based in Cambodia. The story recounts Melissa's experiences settling into Cambodia, particularly her Sunday getaways to the eponymous Hotel Cambodia.
 “Things That Grow” follows Cora, whose husband Paul died four weeks ago. Struggling to deal with grief, Cora finds herself neglecting basic duties, such as showering and maintaining a healthy diet. She has been in contact with a plumber to help her sort out the tree roots that have invaded the bathroom, which only started off as mushrooms when she and Paul first moved in.
 “Fracture” comprises two parallel, interlinked narratives. The story opens with Tony Ferrari, a middle-aged Italian man who "sustained a tibial fracture after falling off a broken ladder" and becomes disgruntled after a negative experience with a doctor. Tony recruits the help of his family, particularly his grandson Luca, to find a way to express his resentment after bureaucratic avenues, such as submitting a formal complaint, prove ineffective. The second narrative focuses on Deepak, the Indian junior consultant doctor who tended Tony's injury. Deepak is in a covert relationship with his boss, Simone, who is 'one of the top orthopaedic surgeons in Australia', and whose whiteness, to Deepak, amplifies his own brownness.
 “Toy Town” follows Maha, who recently immigrated from Beirut, Lebanon to Melbourne, Australia with her husband, Malik, and their four-year-old daughter, Amani. Maha reflects upon the difficulties of immigrating, particularly those of confronting racism. At the play centre that Maha takes her daughter to regularly, she encounters Nicole and her daughter Charlotte. The two women connect over the food they bring – falafel and Vegemite – as they watch their daughters befriend each other effortlessly.
 “Doughnuts” recounts the experiences of Barry Wheeler, a social worker who has had a long working relationship with his first client, a psychologically-impaired woman named Pandora, who frequently experiences mania and psychosis. Certain events lead Barry to visit his father, diagnosed with Alzheimer's, in his aged care facility. Barry brings doughnuts to the visit, which is something that also reminds him of his mother.
 “Allomother” is the first of two stories in this collection written in the first-person narrative perspective. The narrator is the surrogate mother of Molly, who is the child of Jules and Mick, and has agreed upon an arrangement whereby she is allowed to take Molly out one day every week. On this day, she takes her out to the zoo, and Molly is particularly drawn to the elephants, which parallels the story's title as allomothering describes a widespread phenomenon among primates (especially elephants) where non-parents contribute to the care of an offspring.
 “White Sparrow” follows Bec, who is now raising her son Oliver alone after her husband Tom left the family. Oliver has a large port wine stain on his face, and the skin anomaly was the source of Tom's discomfort, which later formed into an intense aversion that culminated in his departure. Bec worries over Oliver's experiences of alienation at school, but is delighted that he develops a somewhat close relationship with his teacher Mr Walton over stories of an incredibly rare albino sparrow, which has recently been sighted in the Melbourne suburbs.
 “Muse” is the only other story besides "Allomother" in this collection that is written in the first-person narrative perspective. Evan is a widow who still grieves over the death of his wife Lola five years ago, to the extent that he revisits their old home to reminisce. Evan has a tense relationship with his daughter Bea. He connects more easily with her partner Edwina, an artist who encourages Evan to attend life drawing classes with her.
 “A Good and Pleasant Thing” closes the short story collection, and features elements that mirror the first story, "Australia Day", such as its setting on the national Australian holiday, and its protagonist of an immigrant from Hong Kong now living in Melbourne. In this story, Mrs Chan, an aging widow in a family of professionals who struggles with experiences of loneliness within the unfamiliar landscape of Melbourne as well as emotional alienation from her Australian-born children and grandchildren. The main event in the short story is a family dinner at a restaurant in the CBD called Celestial Gardens, which resembles a bland caricature of Chineseness adjusted to Western bourgeois tastes. The critic Robert Wood, writing a review on the short story collection, observes that "food becomes a trope through which to regard identity as a whole."

Australia Day won the 2016 Victorian Premier's Literary Award for an Unpublished Manuscript. Following its publication, the work was awarded the 2018 Victorian Premier's Literary Award for Fiction. The judges' report for Australia Day's award praised Cheng for her "inclusive portrait of contemporary Australia [as it] explores what it means to belong, to be Australia; its insight from different vantage points and its photo-realistic narrative make it an exciting and impressive debut."

Room for a Stranger (2019) 
Cheng's first novel Room for a Stranger explores similar themes to her acclaimed short story collection, particularly those of belonging and interpersonal relationships. The novel has generally received positive reviews. However, there is some small criticism of the lack of character development in the novel. The novel alternates between the perspectives of Meg Hughes and Andy Chan.

Meg is a woman in her seventies who lives alone in a house in suburban Melbourne. Along with an increasingly acute feeling of loneliness, Meg grapples with the recent death of her sister and the hardships that come with aging. After a violent home invasion, Meg decides to participate in a homeshare program, where a student may exchange companionship and ten hours of housework for board and meals.

The student is Andy, who moves from Hong Kong to Melbourne for a year to study biomedicine. Along with adjusting to a new and unfamiliar environment, which is also at times quite hostile to foreigners, Andy also grapples with the pressure and turmoil of his family struggling back in Hong Kong. His mother has just been admitted to a psychiatric hospital and his father's cleaning business has failed.

The novel explores the unique relationship that forms between these two characters who, despite their ostensibly contrasting backgrounds, find that they share similar experiences and qualities. As the literary journalist and writer Helen Elliott observes in a review published in The Monthly, "Andy and Meg are both lonely and adrift, both trapped in restrictive identities and subject to prejudice and exclusion of different kinds. Each has a fragile sense of self and an innate timidity."

General practice 
Cheng has written a number of articles relating to her experience as a general practitioner. She has written about the importance of choice with regards to pregnancies, stating that "when a pregnancy is unwanted it's almost always because the arrival of a baby would cause significant financial, emotional and psychological distress." She has also written a piece criticising the 2015 Australian Border Force Act, which "imposes a two-year prison sentence for any 'entrusted person' who makes a record of or discloses 'protected information'" such as the conditions they witness in immigration detention centres. She has also criticised the proposed copayment plan proposed by the Treasurer in the 2014 Federal Budget and its foreseeable detrimental impact on the Australian population, especially its vulnerable groups such as Indigenous Australians, the disabled and the aging.

Personal life 
Cheng is based in Fitzroy, Melbourne. Her writing has appeared in SBS Online, Meanjin, Overland, Griffith REVIEW and Peril. She cites Richard Yates, Alice Munro, Haruki Murakami and Christos Tsiolkas as her literary inspirations and influences.

References 

Australian literature
21st-century Australian women writers
21st-century Australian writers
Writers of Chinese descent

1986 births
Living people
Writers from Adelaide
Australian people of Chinese descent
Australian expatriates in Hong Kong
Australian women medical doctors
Australian medical doctors
Australian general practitioners
Writers from Melbourne